Moradabad (also Romanized as Morādābād) is a village in Shaban Rural District, in the Central District of Nahavand County, Hamadan Province, Iran. At the 2006 census, its population was 469, in 115 families.

References 

Populated places in Nahavand County